Mill Pond, also known unofficially as Agawam Mill Pond, is a  pond in Wareham, Massachusetts. The pond is located northwest of Union Pond, west and north of Spectacle Pond, west of Sandy Pond, and southwest of Glen Charlie Pond. The Agawam River runs through the pond. Route 25 runs through the southwestern part of the pond, and the Exit 2 off-ramp from Route 25 eastbound lies along the shore en route to Glen Charlie Road, which runs along the pond's eastern shore.

External links
Environmental Protection Agency

Wareham, Massachusetts
Ponds of Plymouth County, Massachusetts
Ponds of Massachusetts